Emurena fernandezi is a moth of the family Erebidae first described by Allan Watson in 1975. It is found in Guyana.

References

Phaegopterina
Moths described in 1975